Irumanam Kalanthal Thirumanam is a 1960 Indian Tamil language film directed by Jambanna and G. Viswanath. The film stars Prem Nazir and Ragini.

Plot

Cast 
This list is adapted from Thiraikalanjiyam.

Male cast
Prem Nazir
P. S. Veerappa
C. S. Pandian

Female cast
Ragini
M. N. Rajam
Sukumari

Production 
The film was produced by Nallam Anand Kanchana under the banner V. S. P. Pictures and was directed by Jambanna and G. Viswanath. The directors wrote the screenplay also. A. L. Narayanan wrote the dialogues. Cinematography was done by Sundar Babu.

Soundtrack 
The music was composed by S. Dakshinamurthi and lyrics were penned by A. Maruthakasi, A. L. Narayanan, S. Dakshinamurthi, Ganapriya and Baskaran.

References

External links 
 

1960 drama films
1960 films
Films scored by Susarla Dakshinamurthi
Indian drama films
1960s Tamil-language films